Jeremy Mahony Sinden (14 June 1950 – 29 May 1996) was an English actor who specialised in playing eccentric military men and overgrown schoolboys.

Early life

Sinden was born in London into a theatrical family; both his parents were actors. His father was Sir Donald Sinden and his mother was Diana Mahony. He was educated at Edgeborough and Lancing College.

Career

Theatre
Sinden went to the Pitlochry Festival Theatre to train as an assistant stage manager and then spent two seasons in Stratford-upon-Avon with the Royal Shakespeare Company in 1970-71, also as an assistant stage manager and understudied 45 parts. He appeared in pantomime and rep in Bournemouth, Farnham, Leatherhead and Windsor and he spent one season at the Chichester Festival Theatre. He then decided to enrol at the London Academy of Music and Dramatic Art (LAMDA) where he spent three years and won the Forsyth Award. Whilst still at drama school he made his West End stage acting début in 1972 at the Cambridge Theatre as Private Broughton in R. C. Sherriff's Journey's End and then returned to the Chichester Festival Theatre and appeared in four plays there.

Jeremy played 'Baloo' the bear in a 1984 West End production of Rudyard Kipling's The Jungle Book, at the Adelphi Theatre, a production that also featured Fenella Fielding as Kaa the Python. In 1994 he appeared at the Royal National Theatre as Major Swindon in Shaw's The Devil's Disciple and his last performance was also for the National the following year at the Old Vic playing Toad in Alan Bennett's adaptation of The Wind in the Willows. The Times reviewer described his performance as "a nice smug Toad, who wears everything down to his convict's arrows like a model on a Paris catwalk."

Film
Sinden made his film debut as rebel fighter pilot "Gold Two" in Star Wars (1977). His character was later identified as Dex Tiree in the 2015 reference book, Ultimate Star Wars. He appeared in such films as Rosie Dixon – Night Nurse (1978); Chariots of Fire (1981) playing the president of the Gilbert and Sullivan society; Ascendancy (1983); Madame Sousatzka (1988); The Object of Beauty (1991); Let Him Have It (1991) and The Innocent (1993).

TV
Sinden's work on television included playing Anthony Mortimer in Crossroads for two years, The Expert, Danger UXB, Henry Weldon in Have His Carcase, 'Boy' Mulcaster in Brideshead Revisited, The Far Pavilions, Never the Twain, Robin of Sherwood, Lord Mountbatten: The Last Viceroy, Middlemarch, The House of Windsor and As Time Goes By. His last role was as Mr Barling in The Famous Five series episode Five Go To Smugglers Top, which was dedicated to him following its broadcast in 1996.

Personal life
Sinden married actress Delia Lindsay in 1978. They had two daughters, Kezia and Harriet.

On 4 September 1968, Sinden and his brother Marc were part of the "Na-Na" chorus on "Hey Jude", recording and filming the song with the Beatles at Twickenham Film Studios.

Death
In the mid 1990s Sinden contracted lung cancer. He happened to suffer this affliction at the same time as his best friend, Simon Cadell, was diagnosed with non-Hodgkin lymphoma. Cadell's father, John Cadell, had been Donald Sinden's theatrical agent for over 30 years. On 29 May 1996, twelve weeks after Cadell died, Sinden too succumbed aged, like his friend, just 45.

Filmography

Film

Television

References

External links

1950 births
1996 deaths
Alumni of the London Academy of Music and Dramatic Art
Deaths from lung cancer in England
English male film actors
English male soap opera actors
English male stage actors
People educated at Edgeborough School
People educated at The Hall School, Hampstead
People educated at Lancing College
Royal Shakespeare Company members
Jeremy
20th-century English male actors